Peter Delpeut (born 12 July 1956, Vianen) is a Dutch filmmaker and writer. Several of his films have heavily used found footage. He has won several literary awards for his writing.

Partial filmography
Source:
Lyrical Nitrate (1990)
The Forbidden Quest (1992)
Cinéma Perdu (1995)
Felice...Felice... (1998)
Diva Dolorosa (1999)
In Loving Memory (2001)
Go West, Young Man! (2003)
Immer Fernweh (2011) – short documentary about the German painter Johanna Keizer

Notes

1956 births
Living people
Dutch film directors
Dutch male writers
People from Vianen